The bigtooth river stingray or Tocantins River ray (Potamotrygon henlei) is a species of freshwater fish in the family Potamotrygonidae. It is endemic to the lower Tocantins basin and Araguaia basin in Brazil, and prefers muddy bottoms. It is sometimes kept in aquaria. This stingray is generally common and its population increased after the Tucuruí Dam was completed, unlike many other species in its range.

Appearance and relatives
It is replaced by the closely related P. rex in the mid and upper Tocantins basin, but that species has concentrically clustered yellow-orange spots. Two other close relatives where the spots are yellowish-white (as in P. henlei) are found in other Brazilian rivers: P. leopoldi from the Xingu River basin and P. albimaculata from the Tapajós River basin. Compared to P. leopoldi, P. henlei is duller above, appearing blackish or dark gray-brown (as opposed to deeper black in  P. leopoldi), and its underparts have a large white center and broad brownish-dusky edges (underparts mostly brownish-dusky in P. leopoldi). Compared to P. albimaculata, P. henlei has larger yellowish-white spots above.

References

External links

 Species Description of Potamotrygon henlei at www.shark-references.com

henlei
Endemic fauna of Brazil
Fish of the Tocantins River basin
Fish described in 1855
Taxa named by François-Louis Laporte, comte de Castelnau
Taxonomy articles created by Polbot